The Chhatrasal Stadium is a sports stadium in North Delhi. The stadium is famous for its wrestlers, such as Yogeshwar Dutt, Ravi Kumar Dahiya, Sushil Kumar, Bajrang Punia and Amit Kumar Dahiya who have won medals at Olympics, Commonwealth Games, Asian Games and numerous world championships. The stadium hosts other sports such as athletics, basketball, archery, football and kabaddi. The stadium is currently used by the I-League club Sudeva Delhi FC.

History
The stadium is named after Maharaja Chhatrasal whose figure is mounted with black marble near the entry gate. The original stadium was built in early 1980. During the 2010 Delhi Commonwealth Games it was renovated to new and advanced track. The stadium is directed by Dronacharya awardee, Mahabali Satpal.

The stadium has an approximate capacity of 16,000.

Location
Chhatrasal Stadium is located within walking distance from Model Town Metro Station and Azad Pur Metro Station. There are 13 entry gates. The stadium is often closed on Sundays while training for various disciplines takes place in morning and evening times.

References

Sports venues in Delhi
1980 establishments in Delhi
Sports venues completed in 1980
20th-century architecture in India